Macedon Center is a hamlet located within the Town of Macedon, Wayne County, New York, United States. It is located three miles (5 km) northwest of the hamlet of Macedon, at an elevation of 554 feet (169 m). The primary intersection in the hamlet is at N.Y. Route 31F, also known as Macedon Center Road, and Canandaigua Road.

Macedon Center Volunteer Fire Department hosts the annual Lumberjack Festival each September on their firemen's field.

References

External links
Macedon Center Volunteer Fire Department
Lumberjack Festival

Populated places in Wayne County, New York
Hamlets in Wayne County, New York
Hamlets in New York (state)